This is a list of notable and independent English language peer-reviewed academic journals related to Slavic studies. Journals should be published by major universities, professional associations, national or regional historical societies, or notable independent academic publishers. Periodicals published by non-academic government entities should not be included. Journal entries should have references to journal databases and/or the publisher website to demonstrate they meet inclusion requirements. Journals previously published under a different name or by a different publisher should be footnoted.

Subject peoples, linguistic groupings, and regions covered include: 
 West Slavs: Poles, Czechs, Slovaks, Sorbs, Kashubians, Moravians, Silesians.
 East Slavs: Russians, Byelorussians, Ukrainians.
 South Slavs: Yugoslavs (Slovenes, Croats, Bosnians, Serbs, Montenegrins, Macedonians) and Bulgarians.

This list has a section specifically for historical journals exclusively published before World War II.

General studies

Journals here are primarily but not exclusively related to Slavic history and culture.
 Australian Slavonic and Eastern European Studies (2004present); published by the University of Melbourne;  (online).
 Canadian Slavic Papers: Journal of the Canadian Association of Slavists (1956present); published quarterly by Taylor & Francis; .
 Canadian-American Slavic Studies (1967present); published quarterly by Brill Publishers; .
 Contemporary European History (1992present); published by Cambridge University Press; .
 East European Quarterly (19672008, 20152017); .
 Europe-Asia Studies (1993present); published ten times per year by Taylor & Francis;  (print),  (online).
 Journal of Slavic Military Studies (1988present); published quarterly by Taylor & Francis; .
 New Zealand Slavonic Journal (1968present); published annually by University of Canterbury;  (online).
 Region: Regional Studies Of Russia, Eastern Europe, And Central Asia (1968present); published by Slavica and Institute of Russian Studies at the Hankuk University of Foreign Studies. .
 Slavic and East European Journal (1957present); published quarterly by the Department of Slavic and East European Languages and Cultures, Ohio State University; .
 Slavic Review (1941present); published quarterly by Cambridge University Press; the journal is a publication of the Association for Slavic, East European, and Eurasian Studies;  (online),  (print).
 Slavonic and East European Review (19221927, 1928present); published by the Modern Humanities Research Association and University College London, School of Slavonic and East European Studies;  (print),  (online).
 Slovo (1987present); published by the School of Slavonic and East European Studies, University College London;  (online).
 Studies in East European Thought (1961present); published by Springer;  (print),  (online).

Regional studies
 Demokratizatsiya: The Journal of Post-Soviet Democratization (1985present); published quarterly by the Institute for European, Russian, and Eurasian Studies, George Washington University;  (print),  (online).
 East/West: Journal of Ukrainian Studies (2014present); published twice a year by Canadian Institute of Ukrainian Studies, University of Alberta;  (online).
 Harvard Ukrainian Studies (1977present); published by the Ukrainian Research Institute at Harvard University;  (print),  (online).
 Journal of Belarusian Studies (1965present); published by Brill Publishers;  (print).
 Journal of Modern Russian History and Historiography (2008present); published annually by Brill Schöningh;  (print),  (online).
 Kritika: Explorations in Russian and Eurasian History (2000present); published by Slavica Publishers;  (print),  (online).
 Revolutionary Russia (1988present); published twice per year by Taylor & Francis;  (print),  (online).
 Russian History (Brill journal) (1974present, in English); published quarterly by Brill Publishers;  (print),  (online). ISO 4 Russ. Hist.. Informally abbreviated RuHi.
 Russian History (RAS journal) (Российская история, Rossiiskaya istoriia) (1957present, in Russian); published bi-monthly by the Institute of History of the Russian Academy of Sciences (RAS); . Formerly named History of the USSR (История СССР, Istoriia SSSR) (1957–1992) and National History (Отечественная история, Otechestvennaia istoriia) (1992–2008).
 Russian Review (1941present); published by quarterly Brill Publishers and University of Kansas;  (print),  (online).
 Russian Studies in History (19621992, 1992present); published quarterly by Taylor & Francis;  (print),  (online).
 Soviet Studies (19491992).
 Studies in Soviet Thought (19611992); published by Springer;  (print),  (online).
 The Polish Review (19421945, 19562019); published by The Polish Institute of Arts and Sciences of America and University of Illinois Press;  (print),  (online).
 Tragovi: Journal for Serbian and Croatian Topics (2018present); published biannually by the Serb National Council and the Archive of Serbs in Croatia;  (print),  (online).

Topical
Journals here may not be primarily about Slavic history and culture but have significant coverage.
 Journal of Slavic Linguistics published by The Slavic Linguistics Society and Slavica Publishers;  (print),  (online).

Other geographic areas
This section contains journals about related geographic areas with significant coverage of Slavic history and culture.
 Central Asian Survey (1982present); published quarterly by Taylor & Francis;  (print),  (online).
 Journal of Baltic Studies (1970present); published by Taylor & Francis;  (print),  (online).
 Sibirica: Journal of Siberian Studies (2001present); published by Berghahn;  (print),  (online).
 Scrinia slavonica (2001present); published by the Department for the History of Slavonia, Syrmia and Baranja of the Croatian Institute of History;  (print),  (online).

Related fields and topics
This section contains journals from fields related to history and culture that have significant coverage of Slavic history and culture or non-Slavic historical and cultural topics that have significant coverage of Slavic history and culture.
 Cold War History (2000present); published quarterly by Taylor & Francis;  (print),  (online).
 Communist and Post-Communist Studies (1962present); published by University of California Press;  (print),  (online).
 Eastern European Economics (1962present); published quarterly by Taylor & Francis;  (print),  (online).
 Journal of Borderlands Studies (1986present); five issues per year published by Taylor & Francis for the Association for Borderlands Studies;  (print),  (online).
 Journal of Cold War Studies (1999present); published by MIT Press;  (print),  (online).
 Totalitarian Movements and Political Religions: Politics, Religion & Ideology (2000present); published quarterly by Taylor & Francis;  (print),  (online).

Historical journals
This section includes academic journals published exclusively prior to World War II.
 Under construction

See also
 List of Russian studies centers
 Outline of Slavic history and culture

References

Notes

Citations

External links
Lists of journals related to Slavic history
 Related Journals in Russian, Eurasian, and East European Studies. From Slavic Review. 
 JSTOR Slavic studies journal listing.

Slavic
Slavic